Victoria Kirstyn Williams  (born 19 March 1971) is a Welsh politician who served as Minister for Education in the Welsh Government from 2016 to 2021. She was a Member of the Senedd (MS) from 1999 to 2021. She previously served as the Leader of the Welsh Liberal Democrats from December 2008 to May 2016 and subsequently from June 2017 to November 2017 in an acting capacity.

Early and personal life
Williams was born in Taunton, Somerset to Welsh parents, whilst her librarian father was working there. After moving to Liverpool, in 1974 the family moved to the village of Bynea, Carmarthenshire, where she grew up.

Educated at the independent St Michael's School, Llanelli, she then graduated from the Victoria University of Manchester with an honours degree in American studies, including a period studying at the University of Missouri. She then returned to work for the learning resources department of Carmarthenshire College in Llanelli, before taking up a post as a marketing and public relations executive for a small business in Cardiff.

She is married to a farmer; the couple have three daughters and live on the family farm outside Brecon.

Political career

Williams joined the Welsh Liberal Democrats at the age of 15. In the 1997 general election, she contested the constituency of Ogmore, coming third. For a long time she was a keen advocate of a Welsh Assembly, and she campaigned hard in the 1997 referendum for the creation of the National Assembly for Wales. She was subsequently appointed to the National Assembly Advisory Group by Welsh Secretary Ron Davies.

She was elected as an Assembly Member of the National Assembly for Wales for the constituency of Brecon and Radnorshire in May 1999. In her first term she became her party's health spokesman. She also served as Chair of the Welsh Assembly Health and Social Care Committee between 1999 and 2003.

In the 2006 Welsh Yearbook Political Awards, she was voted "Member to Watch 2006" In a poll at the end of 2006, Williams was voted "Sexiest Female Liberal Democrat" on Stephen Tall's Liberal Goes a Long Way blog.

On 8 December 2008, Williams became leader of the Welsh Liberal Democrats, having defeated Cardiff Central Assembly Member Jenny Randerson.

In 2011, as leader of the Welsh Liberal Democrats, she agreed to support the Welsh Labour Government's 2012–2013 £14.5bn Budget on the basis, amongst other things, of securing the Welsh Pupil Premium: an extra £20m to spend on the education of the poorest pupils. Teaching Unions welcomed the deal, with ATL Cymru director Philip Dixon saying, "Our children are our future and investment in them is investment for all. Labour and the Lib Dems deserve credit for ensuring that our children, especially those in most need, will now get a better start in life."

In 2013, Williams and the Welsh Liberal Democrats more than doubled investment for the Welsh Pupil Premium in exchange for abstaining on the Welsh government's annual budget.

Williams has gained a reputation for campaigning on health issues. In 2012, the Welsh Government agreed to take forward the Welsh Liberal Democrat idea of a Health Technology Fund to allow patients better access to innovative treatments. The following year, the Welsh Liberal Democrats achieved a further £9.5m investment into the Health Technology Fund as well as the establishment of a £50m Intermediate Care Fund to drive integration of health, social services and housing.

In December 2012, Williams won ITV Wales' Assembly Member of the Year Award in a ceremony at Cardiff's City Hall. In the Queen's Birthday Honours 2013, Williams was appointed Commander of The Most Excellent Order of the British Empire for public and political service.

Williams has been part of a long-running ‘More Nurses’ campaign for a law requiring minimum staffing levels for nurses in Welsh hospitals. Kirsty Williams was successful in a legislative ballot (a bill proposed by an individual member is rare) on 11 December 2013, and given leave to proceed with her Bill In 2014,  Nurse Staffing Levels Bill. It was passed and became law in Wales on 21 March 2016. She was made an honorary fellow of the Royal College of Nursing in 2016.

In the elections to the Welsh Assembly on 5 May 2016 Williams retained her Brecon and Radnorshire seat with an increased majority. However, as the sole Liberal Democrat representative in the new Assembly, she stood down as leader of the Welsh Liberal Democrats the day after the election. On the first day of plenary she voted with the Government on the appointment of the First Minister. First Minister Carwyn Jones appointed her to the Welsh Cabinet as Education Secretary; 31 seats are needed for a majority in the Welsh Assembly, Labour had 29, so Williams joining with the Labour administration created a working majority.

On 16 June 2017, Williams once again became leader of the Welsh Liberal Democrats, on an acting basis, after the defeat of the previous leader of the Welsh Liberal Democrats, Mark Williams MP, in the 2017 general election.

She is at the forefront of curriculum reform in Wales and introduced the Curriculum and Assessment (Wales) Bill on 6 July 2020.

On 27 October 2020 she announced that she would not be seeking re-election in the 2021 Senedd election, saying that she was "looking forward to spending more time with my family and I remain committed to my role in Brecon and Radnorshire and look forward to continuing to campaign with my successor to ensure Brecon and Radnorshire returns a Welsh Liberal Democrat voice."

References

External links 

 
Kirsty Williams AM Profile at the site of Welsh Liberal Democrats
National Assembly for Wales Website
Profile on BBC website September 1999

|-

|-

|-

|-

1971 births
20th-century British women politicians
Alumni of the Victoria University of Manchester
Commanders of the Order of the British Empire
Female members of the Senedd
Liberal Democrats (UK) parliamentary candidates
Liberal Democrat members of the Senedd
Living people
People from Taunton
University of Missouri alumni
Wales AMs 1999–2003
Wales AMs 2003–2007
Wales AMs 2007–2011
Wales AMs 2011–2016
Wales MSs 2016–2021
People educated at St Michael's School, Llanelli